Kurt Großkurth (or Grosskurth; 11 May 1909 – 29 May 1975) was a German actor and singer.

Biography

Grosskurth was born in Langenselbold, Germany, in 1909.

He grew up in Rhineland-Palatinate. In the 1920s, he followed his father's wish and went on to study hotel management in Essen, London and Heidelberg. In the early 1930s, he discovered his passion for the stage and he picked up acting and singing in Bavaria. He quickly started performing as a singer, mostly around the Munich area, and guest starred as a tenor in Hamburg and Berlin. After the war, he got hired by several theaters and performed in operettas in Düsseldorf, Munich and Cologne, repeatedly directed by star conductor Franz Marszalek. As the 50s rolled along, he became a familiar movie figure throughout the country. He appeared as a supporting act in a considerable number of productions, which consisted mainly of lighthearted comedies and operettas. Although never seen in a lead role, he performed alongside virtually all of the major actors from post-war Germany. His entire film career spans over ninety movie and TV productions from 1949 to 1975. Several times within two decades, he appeared in the cast of five or six movies coming out the same year. He played the recurring character of a mayor in a popular TV series in the 60s, he could be heard on the radio, and with the 70s came burgeoning international recognition as he landed small roles in major productions. He plays parts in Luchino Visconti's Ludwig as well as in Edward Dymytryk's Bluebeard and in the French George Franju movie La ligne d'ombre. He's also part of the cast in Hollywood classic Willy Wonka and the Chocolate Factory, although his portrayal of character Harold Gloop, a stereotypical thick butcher, remains uncredited.

Death

Großkurth died in Bad Aibling, Germany, shortly after his 66th birthday, on 29 May 1975, from a traffic accident.

His urn stands on the cemetery wall of Grünwald, near Munich.

Filmography 

1950: Wedding with Erika as Jakob
1952: The Smugglers' Banquet as Dikke Charles
1953: Arlette Conquers Paris as Kommissar
1953: The Divorcée (uncredited)
1953: The Night Without Morals
1953: The Little Town Will Go to Sleep
1954: Rose-Girl Resli 
1954: Daybreak
1954: Hoheit lassen bitten as Ahlsen
1954: Sun Over the Adriatic as Ronic
1955: The Spanish Fly as Hartmann
1955: Love's Carnival as Nachtportier
1956: Magic Fire as Magdeburg Theatre Manager 
1956:  as Direktor Otto
1956: Holiday am Wörthersee as Mr. Groß, Hotelkönig aus Chicago
1956: Karussell der Liebe
1956: Hurra - die Firma hat ein Kind as Fabrikant Emil Winninger
1956: Manöverball as Ehemann
1956: The Old Forester House as Herr Engel
1956: The Hunter of Fall as Zollbeamter Niedergstötter
1957: Die verpfuschte Hochzeitsnacht as Raucher im Zug
1957: Tired Theodore as Walter Steinberg 
1957: Two Bavarians in the Harem as Selam, Obereunuche (uncredited)
1957:  as Zappke
1957: Greetings and Kisses from Tegernsee as Amandus
1958: Mikosch, the Pride of the Company as Otto Schummrich 
1958:  as Director Schuehlein
1958:  as Angerholzer
1958: Gräfin Mariza as Dragomir
1958:  as Schorsch Glöckle
1959: La Paloma
1959: Hunting Party
1959: Mikosch of the Secret Service as Otto Schummrich
1959: Mandolins and Moonlight
1959:  as Maximilian Moosbach, Bürgermeister
1959: Kein Mann zum Heiraten as Leo Hammerschmidt
1960: Hit Parade 1960 as Kaffehausbesitzer
1960: Conny and Peter Make Music as Sulzbach
1960: Willy the Private Detective as Ernst Abelmann
1960:We Will Never Part as Marcello Ponella
1961: Der fröhliche Weinberg (TV Movie)
1961: Am Sonntag will mein Süßer mit mir segeln gehn as Himberger, Evelyns Vater
1961: Our Crazy Aunts as Herrmann Schmatzer
1962: Drei Liebesbriefe aus Tirol as Direktor A.B. Cobold 
1962:  as Otto Wehrkamp, Konservenfabrikant 
1962: Dance with Me Into the Morning as Himself
1962: Wenn die Musik spielt am Wörthersee as Chauffeur Adalbert 
1962: The Post Has Gone as Teutobald Stolze
1962: Die lustigen Vagabunden / Das haben die Mädchen gern as Tavernenwirt
1963: Our Crazy Nieces as Hyacinth Grad
1963: Übermut im Salzkammergut as Ruppich
1963: Hochzeit am Neusiedler See / Das Spukschloß im Salzkammergut as Rudi Lustig
1964: Our Crazy Aunts in the South Seas as Hyacinth
1964: Holiday in St. Tropez as Carlos Fonti
1964: Seven Hours of Gunfire as St. James
1965: The Last Tomahawk as Koch 
1966: Spukschloß im Salzkammergut
1966:  as Max
1967: Heubodengeflüster as Pischke
1970: Die Jungfrauen von Bumshausen as Bürgermeister Ehrentraut
1971: Olympia - Olympia (TV Movie)
1971: Willy Wonka & the Chocolate Factory as Mr. Gloop (uncredited)
1971: Obszönitäten / Mädchen, die sich lieben lassen as Der reiche Alte
1972: Bluebeard as Von Sepper's Friend 
1972: Ludwig II as Minister of Finance
1973: The Countess Died of Laughter as Monk
1973: La ligne d'ombre as Alfred and Ernest Jacobus

External links 

1909 births
1975 deaths
German male stage actors
German male film actors
German male television actors
People from Main-Kinzig-Kreis
20th-century German male actors
Road incident deaths in Germany